Teruyasu (written: 照恭 or 照康) is a masculine Japanese given name. Notable people with the name include:

, Japanese ice hockey player
, Japanese pole vaulter

Japanese masculine given names